The Hong Kong–Macau Ferry Terminal is a ferry terminal and heliport, centrally located in Hong Kong. It is also known as the Macau Ferry Terminal, the Hong Kong-Macau Ferry Pier or the Shun Tak Heliport, and has an ICAO code of VHSS.

The terminal is one of the several in Hong Kong that provide ferry services to Macau and cities in southern China. Scheduled helicopter service is provided to Macau, with charter services to other regional destinations.

The terminal is located in Sheung Wan, immediately to the west of Hong Kong's main business district, on the north shore of Hong Kong Island. It is connected to the territory's Mass Transit Railway, and well served by other forms of public transport. The terminal forms part of the Shun Tak Centre, a commercial and transport complex.

History 
Scheduled ferries have run between Hong Kong and Macau since the earliest days of the Hong Kong colony. Ferries to Macau departed from the old Macau Ferry Piers at this location from at least the mid-20th century, although in the 1960s the steamships – Tak Sing, Dai Loy, Fat Shan and the (more luxurious) Macao – would take around four hours for the trip. Also part of the present site was the famous Western Market.

In 1971, the Fat Shan sunk as the result of Typhoon Rose while on its way to Macau. 92 out of 96 aboard died, most of them crew members. They were carrying no passengers.

The ferry terminal, including ferry routes, was temporarily suspended from 4 February 2020 until further notice, due to the COVID-19 pandemic.

Ferry facilities 

The terminal utilises two island piers, each with several ferry docks, linked by enclosed pedestrian bridges to the ticketing and departure/arrival hall facilities in the lower levels of the Shun Tak Centre on the shore. The heliport is located above the inner pier, whilst the Hong Kong Vessel Traffic Centre, which monitors and regulates vessels navigating in the waters of Hong Kong, is located above the outer pier.

The terminal is the main point of departure for ferries to Macau, although services also operate from the Hong Kong-China Ferry Terminal in Tsim Sha Tsui and from Hong Kong International Airport (for transiting passengers only).

Ferry services are provided to Macau by two companies, both of which use a variety of designs of fast ferries, including catamarans and Boeing Jetfoils. TurboJET provides service to the Outer Harbour Ferry Terminal, in central Macau. Cotai Water Jet operate to the Taipa Ferry Terminal on the Taipa island, which enables easy access to The Venetian Macao casino and Macau International Airport. Both operators run services every 30 minutes, or more frequently, during the day, with TurboJET providing a limited overnight service. The journey time is approximately one hour.

Several companies also provide limited service to ports within China's Guangdong, with destinations served including Shekou and Nansha. Other services to Guangdong destinations operate from the Hong Kong-China Ferry Terminal in Tsim Sha Tsui and Hong Kong International Airport (for transiting passengers only).

Accident on 29 November 2013 
On 29 November 2013, a TurboJET double decker ferry with 105 passengers crashed with an unknown object. 85 people were injured in the crash. The ferry crashed on Friday morning at 1.15 am, on the way to Macau.

Heliport

The heliport is formally known as the Shun Tak Heliport . But no refuelling service available.
maximum all up weight not exceeding .

The original heliport at the Hong Kong–Macau Ferry Terminal was built in 1990, and provided a single helipad situated over the western end of the inner pier. The Hong Kong Heliport Expansion Project commenced in April 2008, when a new helipad was built over the eastern end of the same pier linked to a new passenger lounge. Once this was operational, the original helipad was replaced and two helipads linked, with project completion in October 2009.

Macau based Sky Shuttle Helicopters use the heliport to provide a scheduled service to a corresponding heliport above the Outer Harbour Ferry Terminal in Macau. Services operate between 0900 and 2300, with flights departing every 30 minutes or more frequently if traffic demands it, using AgustaWestland AW139 helicopters. The journey time is approximately 16 minutes.

Sky Shuttle also provide charter services on the same route, and from the heliport to other locations in neighbouring region, including Macau International Airport, Shenzhen Bao'an International Airport and Guangzhou Baiyun International Airport.

Destinations

Improvement fee 
Each ferry passenger is charged for 19 HKD regardless of their age. Each helicopter passenger aged 12 or above is charged for 120 HKD for improvement fee and 30 MOP for aviation service fee. Starting from 1 April 1999, the improvement fee for airport transiting passengers who arrive or depart on the same day is waived.

Ground transport 
Apart from ferry and helicopter, the ferry terminal is a public transport hub to various parts of Hong Kong. Adjacent to the terminal is the Sheung Wan MTR station. Several bus terminus, are nearby the terminal, together with a minibus and taxi pick up area at Shun Tak Centre. The Hong Kong Tramway has tram stops in either direction across the Street.

Buses terminate at Hong Kong-Macau Ferry, Rumsey Street, Man Kat Street and Sheung Wan, nearby Hong Kong-Macau Ferry Terminal:
Buses go to parts of Hong Kong Island such as Aldrich Bay, Island Resort and South Horizons

Buses go to parts of Kowloon and New Territories such as City One Shatin, Ho Man Tin, Ping Shek Estate, Choi Fook Estate, Kowloon City Ferry

Buses also go to and from: Yu Chui Court, Cross-Harbour Tunnel Toll Plaza, Tsz Wan Shan, Wan Tau Tong Estate, Luen Wo Hui, Po Tat Estate, Shun Lee, Kai Ching Estate, Ma On Shan, Ma On Shan, Hong Kong International Airport, Ngau Tau Kok, Yuen Long, Tiu Keng Leng.

See also 
 Transport in Hong Kong

References

External links 

 Macau Ferry Information
 [http://www.cotaiwaterjet.com/ Cotai Water Jet

.

Sheung Wan
Heliports in Hong Kong
Piers in Hong Kong
Ferry terminals in Hong Kong
Bus stations in Hong Kong